Caldillo de congrio (Spanish for cusk-eel stock) is a Chilean fish soup. The dish is made of congrio Dorado (pink cusk-eel) or Colorado (red cusk-eel), a cusk-eel species common in the Chilean Sea. The dish is made by boiling together fish heads, onion, garlic, coriander, carrots and pepper. Once these are boiled, only the stock is used. Onion and garlic are fried together with chopped tomatoes. The vegetables are mixed then with the stock, cream, boiled potatoes and marinated and boiled conger.

Chilean Literature Nobel laureate Pablo Neruda wrote an ode to Caldillo de congrio called Oda al Caldillo de Congrio. The Communist Party of Chile has a tradition of serving the Chilean press and media caldillo de congrio at an annual event at which important announcements are made regarding the current year.

See also
 List of soups
 List of fish and seafood soups

References and footnotes

External links
Caldillo de congrio recipe 
Caldillo de congrio recipe on Recidemia 

Chilean cuisine
Fish and seafood soups
Congridae